Eileen Dean (née Burmeister, November 30, 1924 – March 23, 1990) played eight defensive positions for the Rockford Peaches in the All-American Girls Professional Baseball League. Listed at 5' 5", 140 lb., she batted and threw left handed.

Career statistics
Batting 

Fielding

References

External links
Eileen Burmeister at Baseball Historian
Eileen Dean. All-American Girls Professional Baseball League. Retrieved 2019-04-11.

All-American Girls Professional Baseball League players
Rockford Peaches players
1924 births
1990 deaths
20th-century American women
20th-century American people